Mananti Sitompul (EVO: Mananti Sitompoel; 9 June 1909 – ), was a Christian Indonesian politician from North Sumatra. A member of the Indonesian Christian Party (Parkindo), he served in a number of national cabinets during the Indonesian National Revolution. Born in Pahae, North Tapanuli, he studied at the Technische Hoogeschool te Bandoeng (THB), and graduated as a civil engineer in 1939. Subsequently, he worked at the Waterloopkundig Laboratory and later at the Waterstaatsdienst. During the Japanese occupation, he became the head of the Provinciale Waterstaat of West Java, before he moved to Sukabumi and later Jakarta, to work in the Public works office.

Following the proclamation of independence, he served as the deputy head of the West Java Ministry of Public Works. He moved to Pematangsiantar, and later Bukittinggi, and became the head of Sumatra Ministry of Public Works. In 1948, following the capture of the capital of Yogyakarta by Dutch forces, he was appointed both Minister of Public Works and Minister of Health, replacing Herling Laoh and Johannes Leimena respectively. He was replaced as health minister by Soekiman Wirjosandjojo, and after the signing of the Roem–Van Roijen Agreement, was replaced as Public Works minister after the restoration of Minister Herling Laoh. He returned to government in 1950, in the Halim Cabinet, and served as Public Works minister again until the dissolution of the cabinet. He died in 1980.

Early life and youth 

Mananti Sitompul was born in Pahae, in what is today North Tapanuli Regency, North Sumatra. He was the first and only child of a poor peasant family in the Sumatran mountains. When he 5 years old, his father died, and his schooling at Hollandsch-Inlandsche School Tapanuli (HIS) was funded by his mother. He graduated from HIS in 1925, and continued his education to the Meer Uitgebreid Lager Onderwijs Padang. However, his mother was unable to pay taxes and Mananti's transportation fees, and so he continued his education by receiving student scholarships (beurs). He graduated from MULO in 1929, and then attended the Algemene Middelbare School in Yogyakarta (AMS). He received a scholarship from the Rijstfonds to study at the Technische Hoogeschool te Bandoeng (THB) in 1935. There, he struggled to pass his classes, and almost lost his scholarship. However, he was helped by a family member, and he graduated from TBH in 1939, with a degree in Civil Engineering. After graduating, he worked in the field of water management at the Waterloopkundig Laboratory ("Hydraulic laboratory"), at THB. Then, he later worked at the Provinciale Waterstaat, and later at the Waterstaatsdienst.

Political career 

During the Japanese occupation of the country, he became the head of the Provinciale Waterstaat of West Java, before moving to Sukabumi and later Jakarta, to work in the Public works office. Following the Proclamation of Indonesian Independence, and the establishment of a Republican government, he moved back to West Java, and served as the deputy head of the West Java Ministry of Public Works. He left Java for his homeland of Northern Sumatra, and arrived at Pematangsiantar. During Operation Product, he was arrested in Pematangsiantar and was arrested in Medan. In November 1947, he was expelled from Medan and was forced to go to Singapore. In December 1947, he left Singapore and went to Jambi. He was arrested again in Tanjung Pinang, Riau Islands, before heading to Bukittinggi. It was in Sumatra where he became the head of the province's Ministry of Public Works.

In 1948, Dutch forces captured the capital city of Yogyakarta, and the mass arrest of the Indonesian government, an Emergency Government in-exile was established by Minister of Finance Sjafruddin Prawiranegara in Sumatra. As the head of the province's Ministry of Public Works, he was appointed the Minister of Public Works and Minister of Health by Sjafruddin. At that time, he was the only health minister without any medical related experience until the appointment of Budi Gunadi Sadikin in 2020. As minister, he attempted to fix the damage from the Indonesian National Revolution, develop or add jobs for the benefit of the country. He was replaced as health minister by Soekiman Wirjosandjojo in March 1949, and after the signing of the Roem–Van Roijen Agreement, was replaced as Public Works minister after the restoration of Minister Herling Laoh. He returned to government in 1950, in the Halim Cabinet, and served as Public Works minister again until the dissolution of the cabinet. He died in 1980.

References

Citations

Bibliography 

 
 
 

Government ministers of Indonesia
1909 births
1980 deaths
Transport ministers of Indonesia